The Museo delle Arti Monastiche e delle tradizioni popolari (Museum of Monastic Arts and Popular Traditions, also known as the Museo Arti Monastiche or MAM) is a museum in Serra de' Conti, Ancona Province, Italy. The museum showcases various art and artifacts from the nearby Monastery of St. Mary Magdalene of Serra de 'Conti.

References

External links
 
Photo gallery hosted by The Franciscan Archive 

Buildings and structures in the Province of Ancona
Museums in Marche